Smt. Vinatadevi Tope Social Service League (also known as SSL or the League) is one of the oldest and most prestigious student committees of Government Law College, Mumbai. The league was established in 1966 by then Principal Dr. Trimbak Krishna Tope in the fond memory of his late wife, Smt. Vinatieri Tope. The league celebrated its semicentennial anniversary in the academic year 2015-16.

The league undertakes various projects for the welfare of society as a whole. This is achieved by tie-ups with the government as well as non-profit organizations. Some of the major events organized by SSL include: Udaan - An Inter NGO Competition for Children; Shikhar - An Exhibition cum Charity Sale; and Vivechan - A Socio-Legal Essay Writing Competition.

Origins and Founding

Principal Dr. Trimbak Krishna Tope was a distinguished jurist, former two-time Vice Chancellor of the University of Mumbai, former Sheriff of Mumbai, and the longest serving Principal of Government Law College, Mumbai. He was a firm believer in social service. He wanted to sensitize the law students about the real picture of the society, so that they work towards its betterment, selflessly, as law is an instrument of social change.

As a result, Dr. Tope laid the foundation stone of Smt. Vinatadevi Tope Social Service League in the year 1966, also serving as its first and longest serving President, from 1966 to 1975.

SSL is one of the four oldest student committees of Government Law College, Mumbai (the other three being the Moot Court Association, the Magazine Committee and the Sports Committee). It is also the only committee whose President was also the Principal of Government Law College.

Activities and Events

Every year, SSL undertakes various projects, benefiting students, NGOs, and the community at large. Some of the major projects are as follows:-
Shikhar - An Exhibition cum Charity Sale
Udaan - Inter NGO Fest for Underprivileged Children
Vivechan - National Socio-Legal Essay Competition
Blood Donation Drive
Beach Cleanliness Drive
Youth for Healthy Mumbai Awareness Drive
NGO Visits
Drishti - A cell to help and support the visually challenged students of the college
Sheshpath - National Scribes & Readers Project in collaboration with Retina India
Principal Dr. Trimbak Krishna Tope Memorial Lecture

SSL Core for 2016-17
The following is SSL Core for 2016-17:
Chairperson: Prof. Dr. Rachita Ratho
General Secretary: Shamal Kamble
Additional General Secretary: Dipti Karadkar
Treasurer: Kanika Tyagi
Additional Treasurer: Ayushi Tambi
Creative Head: Kirti Bhardwaj
Drishti Head: Kashish Garg
Fundraising Head: Chitrakshi Dubey
NGO Head: Rashmika Singh Tanwar
Public Relations Head: Abeera Dubey
Student Coordinator: Prarthna Nanda

References

1966 establishments in Maharashtra
Organizations established in 1966
Student organisations in India